Danushka Madushanka (born 1 August 1990) is a Sri Lankan cricketer. He made his Twenty20 debut on 6 January 2020, for Unichela Sports Club in the 2019–20 SLC Twenty20 Tournament.

References

External links
 

1990 births
Living people
Sri Lankan cricketers
Moors Sports Club cricketers
Place of birth missing (living people)